Lupinus succulentus is a species of lupine known by the common names hollowleaf annual lupine, arroyo lupine, and succulent lupine.

It is native to California, where it is common throughout much of the state, and adjacent sections of Arizona and Baja California. L. succulentus is known from many types of habitat and it can colonize disturbed areas.

Description
The amount of fertility and moisture generally dictates the height of the plant. Prefers moist clay or heavy soils in full sun. Each palmate leaf is made up of 7 to 9 leaflets up to 6 centimeters long.

The inflorescence is a series of whorls of flowers each between 1 and 2 centimeters long. The flower is generally purple-blue with a white or pink patch on its banner, and there are sometimes flowers in shades of light purple, pink, and white.

The fruit is a roughly hairy legume pod up to 5 centimeters long and about 1 centimeter wide.

Cultivation
Being the most water tolerant of all lupines, L. succulentus is used cultivated as an ornamental plant, for flower borders, native plant and wildlife gardens, and in natural landscaping projects.
Horticultural specifications  
Height: 1–4 feet
Optimum soil temperature for germination: 55 °F–70 °F
Blooming Period: April–May
Germination: 15–75 days
Sowing depth: 1/8"

External links

Jepson Manual Treatment — Lupinus succulentus
CalFlora Database: Lupinus succulentus (arroyo lupine)
Lupinus succulentus Photo gallery

succulentus
Flora of Arizona
Flora of Baja California
Flora of California
Flora of Sonora
Natural history of the California chaparral and woodlands
Natural history of the California Coast Ranges
Natural history of the Central Valley (California)
Natural history of the Peninsular Ranges
Natural history of the San Francisco Bay Area
Natural history of the Santa Monica Mountains
Natural history of the Transverse Ranges
Garden plants of North America
Flora without expected TNC conservation status